Vosbučiai (formerly ) is a village in Kėdainiai district municipality, in Kaunas County, in central Lithuania. According to the 2011 census, the village had a population of 8 people. There are the Vosbučiai hillfort and the Vosbučiai outcrop (nature heritage object) in the village. The Lapkalnys-Paliepiai Forest begins west from the village. The Vocbučiai Botanical Zoological Sanctuary is located in Vosbučiai.

Vosbučiai is known since 1593. There was a folwark before the Soviet era.

Demography

Images

References

Villages in Kaunas County
Kėdainiai District Municipality